The year 2013 is the 4th year in the history of Australian Fighting Championship (AFC), a mixed martial arts promotion based in Australia. In 2013 AFC held 3 events.

Events list

AFC 7 

AFC 7 was an event held on December 14, 2013, at Melbourne Pavilion in Melbourne, Australia.

Results

AFC 6 

AFC 6 was an event held on August 24, 2013, at Melbourne Pavilion in Melbourne, Australia.

Results

AFC 5 

AFC 5 was an event held on May 10, 2013, at Melbourne Pavilion in Melbourne, Australia.

Results

References 

2013 in mixed martial arts
2013 in Australian sport
AFC (mixed martial arts) events